Mudirajupalem is a village located in Gannavaram mandal, Krishna district, Andhra Pradesh, India.

Population 

According to Indian electoral revision on 1 January 2016, nearly 570 voters are here in Mudirajupalem and approximate population figure is 800.

References

Villages in Krishna district